Thomas Leger (died 1468) was a Roman Catholic prelate who briefly served as Bishop of Limerick.

Biography
Begley records that Legger was appointed Bishop of Limerick by Pope Callixtus III after news reached Rome that John Mothel had died. Legger never received consecration and died in 1468.

See also
Catholic Church in Ireland

References

1468 deaths
Irish Roman Catholic bishops